Maryland increased from 6 to 8 representatives after the 1790 census. The previous mixed district/at-large system was replaced with a conventional district system.

See also
 United States House of Representatives elections, 1792 and 1793
 List of United States representatives from Maryland

References

Maryland
1792
United States House of Representatives